Batticaloa Museum is a small museum, which is located in inside of Batticaloa Fort, Batticaloa. It was founded in 1999. The museum has rare stuff such as Palm-leaf manuscripts, British era government items, tools and utensils.

Gallery

References 

The information in this article is based on that in its Tamil equivalent.

External links 

Cultural buildings in Batticaloa
Museums in Batticaloa District